"Philia" is the sixth single by Versailles, released on March 16, 2011. The title track was used as the theme song to the TV show Onegai Kanaete Versailles, which starred the band themselves. The single came in three editions, each with a different cover: a regular with just the CD, and two limited editions each with a different DVD. The first included live performances from their concert at Shibuya C.C. Lemon Hall on September 4, 2010, the other has a promotional video for the title track that is different from the one used to promote on TV.

Track listing

References 

Versailles (band) songs
2011 singles
Songs written by Hizaki
2011 songs
Songs written by Kamijo (musician)
Warner Music Japan singles